Willis Everett Cohoon (April 8, 1902 – November 28, 1960) was an American attorney and politician who served as a member of the House of Delegates.

Memberships/Affiliations History

References

External links 
 
 

1902 births
1960 deaths
Democratic Party members of the Virginia House of Delegates
20th-century American politicians
Politicians from Montgomery, Alabama
Auburn University alumni
Virginia Military Institute alumni